Chesapeake Public Schools (CPS), also known as Chesapeake City Public Schools, is the school division that administers public education in the United States city of Chesapeake, Virginia. The Superintendent is Dr. Jared A. Cotton. On July 27, 2020, the division school board voted a 100% online start to the 2020-2021 school year.

History
In 2004 the school board revealed a building plan that stated that the renovations needed to the schools would total $500,000.

Schools
High schools
 Deep Creek High School
 Grassfield High School
 Great Bridge High School
 Hickory High School
 Indian River High School
 Oscar Smith High School
 Western Branch High School

Middle schools
 Crestwood Middle School
 Deep Creek Middle School
 Great Bridge Middle School
 Greenbrier Middle School
 Hickory Middle School
 As of 2004 the official capacity is 1,500, but the school had 1,871. To deal with the overcrowding the school had 26 portable classrooms.
 Indian River Middle School
 Jolliff Middle School
 Hugo Owens Middle School
 In 2004 Matthew Bowers of The Virginian Pilot wrote that the building's condition was deteriorating and that compared to Hickory Middle, "is even more crowded".
 Oscar Smith Middle School
 Western Branch Middle School

Elementary schools
 B. M. Williams Primary
 Butts Road Intermediate
 Butts Road Primary School
 Camelot Elementary School
 Carver Intermediate School
 Cedar Road Elementary
 Chittum Elementary School
 Crestwood Intermediate
 Deep Creek Central Elementary
 Deep Creek Elementary
 Georgetown Primary
 Grassfield Elementary School
 Great Bridge Intermediate
 Great Bridge Primary School
 Greenbrier Intermediate
 Greenbrier Primary School
 Hickory Elementary School
 Norfolk Highlands Primary
 Portlock Primary School
 Rena B. Wright Primary
 Southeastern Elementary
 Southwestern Elementary
 Sparrow Road Intermediate
 Thurgood Marshall Elementary
 Treakle Elementary School
 Truitt Intermediate
 Western Branch Intermediate
 Western Branch Primary

References

External links 
 Chesapeake Public Schools (Official site)

School divisions in Virginia
Education in Chesapeake, Virginia